Ancestor Stones is a 2006 novel by Aminatta Forna about the experiences of four women in a polygamous family in West Africa.

Reception
Uzodinma Iweala reviewing Ancestor Stones "wanted to know more: how the characters feel about one another, not just how they feel about the chaotic events they’re describing." Bernardine Evaristo, writing in The Guardian, found the book's backcover blurb, "The Story of 20th-century Africa ...." "ridiculous", but found it "a wonderfully ambitious novel written from the inside" and concluded "This is her [Forna's] first novel, but it is too sophisticated to read like one."

Ancestor Stones has also been reviewed by Booklist, Choice Reviews, Library Journal, Publishers Weekly, Kirkus Reviews, African Business, Entertainment Weekly, and The New Yorker.

Awards
2007 Hurston-Wright Legacy Award Debut Fiction - winner
2008 LiBeraturpreis - winner
2010 Aidoo-Snyder Book Award - winner (best creative work)

References

2006 novels